Stowey Castle (or Nether Stowey Castle known locally as The Mount) was a Norman motte-and-bailey castle, built in the 11th century, in the village of Nether Stowey on the Quantock Hills in Somerset, England. It has been designated as a Scheduled Monument, the foundations of the keep are also a Grade I listed building.

Details

It consisted of a square keep, (which may have been stone, or a wooden superstructure on stone foundations) and its defences, and an outer and an inner bailey. The motte has a flat top.

Alfred of Spain is the Norman Lord of Stowey recorded in Domesday and the building of the castle is normally attributed to him or to his daughter Isabel. The earliest written reference to the castle is in a forged charter of 1154.

The top of the motte was excavated by amateurs in the 19th Century but no record was made of any finds. The mounds around the top of the motte are assumed to be spoil heaps from these excavations to clear the foundations of the keep, although it has also been suggested that they may be the remains of towers.

The castle was destroyed in the 15th century, which may have been as a penalty for the local Lord Audley's involvement in the Second Cornish Uprising of 1497 led by Perkin Warbeck. Some of the stone was used in the building of Stowey Court in the village.

See also
Castles in Great Britain and Ireland
List of castles in England

References

Castles in Somerset
Grade I listed buildings in Sedgemoor
Scheduled monuments in Sedgemoor